Gheorghe Epurescu, better known as George Epurescu (born 10 March 1970) is a Romanian fencer. He competed in the épée events at the 1992 and 1996 Summer Olympics. He is now a fencing coach at CSA Steaua București and assistant coach of the national women's épée team.

References

External links
 

1970 births
Living people
Romanian male épée fencers
Olympic fencers of Romania
Fencers at the 1992 Summer Olympics
Fencers at the 1996 Summer Olympics